Gies College of Business is the business school of the University of Illinois Urbana-Champaign, a public research university in Champaign, Illinois. The college offers undergraduate program, masters programs, and a PhD program. The college and its Department of Accountancy are separately accredited by  International.

As of 2021, there are more than 70,000 Gies Business alumni worldwide, including several Fulbright scholars.

History
The university senate approved the College of Commerce and Business Administration on June 9, 1914  at the request of [David Kinley], a university vice president who would later serve as president of the University of Illinois. The college was officially formed on April 27, 1915 through a vote of the University of Illinois Board of Trustees. The college began with three departments: Economics, Business Organization and Operation, and Transportation.

Since 2015, Gies College of Business has partnered with Coursera to offer online MBA program and an online MSA program. The school started with 113 students in the beginning for the online programs and later grew to more than 3,200 degree-seeking students from 46 states in United States and more than 90 countries in the world. The selectivity and acceptance rate to the program initially was 20.9% and is currently at 53%.

In 2019, the school announced that it was suspending its on-campus full-time MBA, part-time MBA, and executive MBA.

College naming gifts
In 2017, alumni Larry Gies and Beth Gies donated US$150 million to the school, which was renamed the Gies College of Business in their honor. In 2020, alumnus Don Edwards donated US$10 million and the business school also further received a pledge in 2020 for $2.5 million for construction of shared instructional facility.

Campus 

  Gies College of Business is located in Champaign, Illinois. The campus is located around the intersection of Gregory Street and Sixth Street. This is the current home of Gies College of Business.  When the college was first formed, however, it occupied the Commerce Building, now the East half of the Administration Building on the Main Quad.  The Commerce building, dedicated in 1913, was built at a cost of $100 thousand.

The college currently occupies three buildings: Wohlers Hall, Business Instructional Facility (BIF), and the Irwin Doctoral Study Hall. This area is known as the Business Quad and is considered part of the South Campus.

Wohlers Hall, formerly known as Commerce West, was built in 1963. Albert H. and Jane Wohlers provided a $6 million naming gift in 2000 for renovations.

The Business Instructional Facility (commonly referred to as "BIF"), approved by the UI Board of Trustees on July 14, 2004, stands opposite of Wohlers Hall across Sixth Street.  The $62 million project, designed by architect Cesar Pelli, is LEED-certified because of its "green", environmentally friendly elements.

Academic departments 
Gies College of Business houses three departments: Accountancy, Business Administration, and Finance.

Accountancy 

The Department of Accountancy was founded in 1953.

The University offered courses in accounting before the creation of the University of Illinois Urbana-Champaign College of Business. The courses in the university were offered through the Department of Economics from 1902 to 1915. The college began the first PhD program in 1937 and has graduated more accountancy PhD candidates than any other accountancy department in the United States. After the formation of the college, the accountancy program  was moved into the Department of Business Organization until the Department's reorganization in the 1950s.

In 1919, H.T. Scovill helped establish the Beta Alpha Psi accounting honor society.

Business Administration 

The Department of Business Administration was founded in 1968 through the mergers of the Department of Industrial Administration and Marketing and the Graduate School of Business Administration. This includes a iMBA program featured on Coursera.

Finance 
In 1957, the UI Board of Trustees approved the Dean's proposal to create a Department of Finance. The MSF program began the following year.

Academies and centers

University of Illinois-Deloitte Foundation Center for Business Analytics 
The University of Illinois-Deloitte Foundation Center for Business Analytics was established on October 25, 2016 by Deloitte Foundation thanks to a $5 million gift from the Deloitte Foundation and Deloitte's retired and current partners, principals, managing directors and employees.

Illinois MakerLab 
The Illinois MakerLab is the world's first business school 3D printing lab located on the third floor of the Business Instructional Facility. After opening in Spring of 2013, the MakerLab has provided printing, custom designing and prototyping, educational, and other related services for both the Urbana-Champaign and University of Illinois community. The lab is equipped with over 20 Ultimaker 3D printers and is run by undergraduate and graduate students. The lab was co-founded by Aric Rindfleisch and Vishal Sachdev.

Origin Ventures Academy for Entrepreneurial Leadership 
The Origin Ventures Academy for Entrepreneurial Leadership, established in 2004, is responsible for cross-campus and multidisciplinary programs for entrepreneurial students from all backgrounds including the award-winning iVenture Accelerator and Illinois Social Innovation.

Rankings 
In 2019, Public Accounting Report’s Annual Professors Survey has ranked the college under top 3 for undergraduate, graduate, and Ph.D. accounting programs.

Notable people

Alumni
Gies College of Business has many notable alumni. Alumni are denoted by their area of study: accountancy (ACCY), business administration (BADM), finance (FIN), or general/unassigned (GEN) or MBA.

Academia 
Michael Mikhail (MAS '88) - Dean, College of Business Administration at the University of Illinois at Chicago
 Robert J. Swieringa (ACCY '69) – Dean, Cornell University and former member of the Financial Accounting Standards Board.
Nicholas Dopuch (ACCY '61) – Former Head of Accounting, Washington University in St. Louis.
A.C. Littleton (ACCY '12, '18, '31) – Professor and accounting historian University of Illinois, editor-in-chief The Accounting Review, Accounting Hall of Fame inductee
Sybil C. Mobley (ACCY '64) – Dean and Head of Accounting, Florida A&M.

Chitra Ramanathan (M.B.A ‘97) - Contemporary visual artist, Abstract Painting

Clyde Summers (ACCY '39), labor lawyer and law professor at the Yale Law School and University of Pennsylvania Law School, subject of In re Summers

Business 
Thomas Siebel (MBA) - Billionaire and Founder of Siebel Systems, C3.ai
Michael Krasny (FIN '75) - Billionaire and Founder of CDW Corporation
Sunil Benimadhu (MBA) - CEO of Stock Exchange of Mauritius
Ravin Gandhi (FIN '1994) - Founder of Coatings and Chemicals Corporation
Jim Cantalupo (ACCY '66) – Former Chairman and CEO of McDonald's (1991–2004)
 Richard H. Frank (BADM '64) – Former President, Walt Disney Studios
George Henry Lesch (GEN '31) – Chairman of the Board, Colgate-Palmolive Company
 Thomas Murphy (ACCY '38) – Former CEO and Chairman, General Motors
John D. Zeglis (FIN '69) – Former President, AT&T; Former Chairman and CEO of AT&T Wireless

Government and politics 
Kelly Loeffler - United States Senator for Georgia
Charles Bowsher (ACCY '53) – Comptroller General of the United States, Government Accountability Office
George Evan Howell (GEN '27), U.S. Congressman
Samuel K. Skinner (ACCY, '60) – Secretary of Transportation (1989–1991); White House Chief of Staff during the George H. W. Bush Administration (1992)

Armed forces
Alfred G. Harms, Jr. (MBA) - Retired Vice Admiral, United States Navy
Alex Fink (MBA) - Major General, Chief of Enterprise Marketing at United States Army
 Wilma L. Vaught (BADM '52) –  Retired Brigadier General, United States Air Force

Sports
 Mike Small ('88) - Professional golfer and Head Coach for Illinois Fighting Illini men's golf
 Josh Whitman (FIN '01) – Athletic director at the University of Illinois, former NFL player

Faculty
Heitor Almeida - Stanley C. and Joan J. Golder Chair in Corporate Finance
Dan Bernhardt - IBE Distinguished Professor
Jeffrey Brown - Josef and Margot Lakonishok Professor of Business
Richard Engelbrecht-Wiggans - IBE Distinguished Professor Emeritus of Business Administration
Jack A. Goncalo - Professor of Business Administration
John Kindt - Professor Emeritus of Business Administration
Kent Monroe - John M. Jones Distinguished Professor of Marketing 
Aric Rindfleisch - John M. Jones Professor of Marketing
Daniel Simons - Professor of Business Administration
Theodore Sougiannis - KPMG Distinguished Professor of Accountancy
Scott Weisbenner - William G. Karnes Professor in Mergers and Acquisitions
Jagdish Sheth - Former Distinguished Professor of Marketing (1969 to 1983)
 Shahbaz Gill - Assistant Professor

See also 
 List of United States business school rankings
 List of business schools in the United States

References

Further reading 
 Orta, Andrew. Making Global MBAs: The Culture of Business and the Business of Culture. (University of California Press, 2019)
 Hoxie, Frederick E. The University of Illinois: Engine of Innovation. (University of Illinois Press, 2017)

External links 
 

Business schools in Illinois
Business
Educational institutions established in 1915
1915 establishments in Illinois